The Minister in the Presidency responsible for Electricity is a minister of the South African government, responsible for overseeing all aspects of the government's response to the ongoing electricity crisis.

The incumbent Minister is Kgosientso Ramokgopa of the African National Congress, who is the first holder of the position.

History
During president Cyril Ramaphosa's 2023 State of the Nation Address on 9 February 2023, he announced, that he would appoint a "Minister of Electricity" based in the Presidency, tasked with overseeing all aspects of the country's response to the ongoing electricity crisis, including leading the National Energy Crisis Committee. The Minister would work with the board of Eskom and all other relevant departments to resolve the crisis.

Ramaphosa reshuffled his cabinet on 6 March 2023 and announced that the head of the Investment and Infrastructure Office in the Presidency Kgosientso Ramokgopa would be the first Minister in the Presidency responsible for Electricity.

List

See also
Minister of Public Enterprises
Minister of Mineral Resources and Energy

References

Lists of political office-holders in South Africa